Bothrocerambyx nevermanni is a species of beetle in the family Cerambycidae, the only species in the genus Bothrocerambyx. They can be found in Costa Rica, Panama, Colombia, and Ecuador.

References

Cerambycini